Santhu Straight Forward is a 2016 Indian Kannada-language romantic action comedy film directed by Mahesh Rao and produced by K. Manju. The film features Yash and Radhika Pandit. The music is composed by V. Harikrishna. 

The film was dubbed in Hindi and Bengali  as Rambo Straight Forward and in Tamil and Malayalam as Sooryavamsi. The makers had clarified that the movie was inspired by the 2015 Tamil movie Vaalu. Producer Manju had bought the remake rights of the Tamil film earlier.

Plot
Deva is a gangster and real estate dealer, who locks horns with a Dubai-based Don  in a real estate issue. Santhosh aka Santhu, a straight forward youngster who is loved by his family. One day, he falls in love with Ananya, who is an B.Arch student. Initially, Santhu befriends Ananya to woo her and after few days, He learns that she is engaged to Deva, due to her dead parents's wish. Though she loves Santhu, she keeps on avoiding him. Deva soon learns of this and a cat-mouse game begins between Santhu and Deva. At Deva's wedding, Ananya is kidnapped by Dubai-based don Bhai and is about to kill her in front of Deva until Santhu arrives and kills Bhai. Deva unites the lovers where Santhu reveals to Ananya that the Bhai is a fake person and that the guy who played Bhai is his uncle. He reveals that Ananya's friends and grandparents are also involved in the plan, thus fooling Deva. Santhu and Ananya get married in the presence of their families, friends and Deva.

Cast 

 Yash as Santhosh aka Santhu
 Radhika Pandit as Ananya
 Shaam as Deva
 Sneha Acharya as Muskhan
 Devaraj as Santhu's father 
 Anant Nag as Ananya's grandfather 
 Thilak as Imraan
 Besant Ravi
 Girish Shivanna as Santhu's friend
 Sumithra
 Seetha as Santhu's mother 
 Avinash as Ananya's Father
 Besant Ravi
 Veena Sundar
 Charandeep
 P. Ravi Shankar in a guest appearance as Santhu's uncle 
 Shobaraj and Neenam Ashwath in a guest appearance in the song "Self Made Shehazada"

Soundtrack

V. Harikrishna has composed for original score and soundtracks of the film.

Critical reception
A critic from The Times of India gave the film a rating of three out of five stars and stated that "This film is for fans of commercial cinema in its purest form. Of course, it may have a song or fight extra, but that's always a bonus for people who like such cinema. A critic from Bangalore Mirror wrote that 'Santhu Straighforward is the kind of film that makers think consolidates a fan base of a star. This proves otherwise. A critic from The New Indian Express wrote that "The film has a thin plot but it keeps you entertained. It's out-and-out Yash's show that cannot be missed by his fans". A critic from Deccan Chronicle gave the film a rating of two-and-a-half out of five stars and wrote that "No doubt that this one is straight from the rocking star to his fan!".

References

External links
 

2016 films
2010s Kannada-language films
Indian action comedy films
Films scored by V. Harikrishna
2016 masala films
Indian romantic comedy films
Kannada remakes of Tamil films
Films directed by Mahesh Rao
2016 action comedy films
2016 romantic comedy films